Dobie is an unincorporated community located in the towns of Oak Grove and Rice Lake, Barron County, Wisconsin, United States.

Notes

Unincorporated communities in Barron County, Wisconsin
Unincorporated communities in Wisconsin